Anders Gunnar Lindquist (born November 21, 1942) is a Swedish applied mathematician and control theorist. He has made contributions to the theory of partial realization, stochastic modeling, estimation and control, and moment problems in systems and control. In particular, he is known for the discovery of the fast filtering algorithms for (discrete-time) Kalman filtering in the early 1970s, and his seminal work on the separation principle of stochastic optimal control and, in collaborations with Giorgio Picci, the Geometric Theory for Stochastic Realization.
Together with late Christopher I. Byrnes (dean of the School of Engineering & Applied Science at Washington University in St. Louis from 1991 to 2006) and Tryphon T. Georgiou (Vincentine Hermes-Luh Chair in Electrical Engineering at the University of Minnesota), he is one of the founder of the so-called Byrnes-Georgiou-Lindquist school. They pioneered a new moment-based approach for the solution of control and estimation problems with complexity constraints.

He has been Professor in three continents: America (University of Kentucky, USA), Europe (Royal Institute of Technology, Sweden) and Asia (Shanghai Jiao Tong University, China).

Biography
Lindquist was born in Lund, Sweden. He received his PhD degree from KTH Royal Institute of Technology in Stockholm under the supervision of Lars Erik Zachrisson, and was appointed a Docent of Optimization and Systems Theory in 1972. Subsequently, he held visiting positions at the University of Florida, Brown University, and the State University of New York at Albany, until 1974, when he joined the faculty of Mathematics at the University of Kentucky.  He remained at Kentucky until 1983 at which time he returned to the Royal Institute of Technology as a Professor and the Chair of Optimization and Systems Theory.

Over the years, Lindquist has held visiting and affiliate positions at the Washington University in St. Louis, the University of Padova, Consiglio Nazionale delle Ricerche, Arizona State University, the International Institute of Applied Systems Analysis in Vienna, the Russian Academy of Sciences in Moscow, East China Normal University in Shanghai, the Technion in Haifa, the University of California at Berkeley, and the University of Kyoto. He was the Head of the Mathematics Department at the Royal Institute of Technology from 2000 until 2009. Between 2006 and 2014 he was the Director of the Strategic Research Center for Industrial and Applied Mathematics (CIAM) at KTH. In 2011 he was appointed Zhiyuan Chair Professor and Qian Ren Scholar at Shanghai Jiao Tong University.

Lindquist is a member of the Royal Swedish Academy of Engineering Sciences (IVA), a Foreign Member of the Chinese Academy of Sciences (2015), a Member of the Academia Europaea (Academy of Europe), an Honorary Member of Hungarian Operations Research Society, and a Foreign Member of Russian Academy of Natural Sciences. He is a Life Fellow of the IEEE, a Fellow of the Society for Industrial and Applied Mathematics and a Fellow of the International Federation of Automatic Control.  He was awarded the SIGEST of the SIAM Review (2001) and the George S. Axelby Award of the IEEE Control Systems Society (2003). He was the Zaborszky Distinguished Lecturer in 2000 and the Distinguished Israel Pollak Lecturer in 2005 and 2006. He received the W. T. and Idalia Reid Prize in Mathematics in 2009 for his "fundamental contributions to the theory of stochastic systems, signals, and control" and an Honorary Doctorate (Doctor Scientiarum Honoris Causa) from The Technion in 2010.
He is the recipient of the 2020 IEEE Field Medal in Systems and Control, the IEEE Control Systems Award.
Anders Lindquist is a Knight Commander with Star of the Order of the Holy Sepulchre.

Selection of publications
 A. Lindquist, On feedback control of linear stochastic systems, SIAM J.Control, 11 (May 1973), 323–343.
 A. Lindquist, "A new algorithm for optimal filtering of discrete-time stationary processes," SIAM J. Control 12 (November 1974) 736–746.
 A. Lindquist with G. Picci, On the stochastic realization problem, SIAM J. Control and Optimization, 17 (1979), 365–389.
 W.B. Gragg and A. Lindquist, On the partial realization problem,  Linear Algebra and Appl.50 (1983), 277–319.
 A. Lindquist and G. Picci, Realization theory for multivariate stationary Gaussian processes, SIAM J. Control and Optimization 23 (1985), 809–857.
 C. I. Byrnes, A. Lindquist, S. V. Gusev and A. S. Matveev, A complete parameterization of all positive rational extensions of a covariance sequence, IEEE Transactions on Automatic Control AC-40 (1995), 1841–1857.
 A. Lindquist and V.A. Yakubovich, Optimal damping of forced oscillations in discrete-time systems, IEEE Transactions on Automatic Control AC-42 (1997), 786–802.
 C. I. Byrnes, T. T. Georgiou and A. Lindquist, A new approach to spectral estimation: A tunable high-resolution spectral estimator, IEEE Trans. Signal Process. SP-49 (2000), 3189–3205.
 C. I. Byrnes, T. T. Georgiou and A. Lindquist, A generalized entropy criterion for Nevanlinna-Pick interpolation with degree constraint, IEEE Transactions on Automatic Control AC-46 (2001), 822–839.
 C. I. Byrnes, S. V. Gusev and Lindquist, From finite covariance windows to modeling filters: A convex optimization approach, SIAM Review 43 (December 2001), 645–675.
 C. I. Byrnes, T. T. Georgiou, A. Lindquist and A.  Megretski, Generalized interpolation in H-infinity with a complexity constraint, Trans. American Mathematical Society 358 (2006), no. 3, pp. 965–987.
 T.T. Georgiou and A. Lindquist, The separation principle in stochastic control, redux, IEEE Transactions on Automatic Control 58 (October 2013), 2481–2494.
 A. Lindquist and G. Picci, The circulant rational covariance extension problem: the complete solution, IEEE Transactions on Automatic Control 58 (November 2013), 2848–2861.
 J. Karlsson, A. Lindquist and A. Ringh, The multidimensional moment problem with complexity constraint, Integral Equations and Operator Theory, 2015.
 A. Lindquist and G. Picci, Linear Stochastic Systems:  A Geometric Approach to Modeling, Estimation and Identification, Series in Contemporary Mathematics, Vol.1, Springer Berlin Heidelberg, 2015.

References

External links
 Faculty page, the Royal Institute of Technology
 Anders Lindquist, the Mathematics Genealogy Project

1942 births
Control theorists
Swedish electrical engineers
Members of the Royal Swedish Academy of Engineering Sciences
Foreign members of the Chinese Academy of Sciences
Academic staff of the KTH Royal Institute of Technology
Academia Europaea
Living people
People from Lund
KTH Royal Institute of Technology alumni
University of Kentucky faculty
Fellows of the Society for Industrial and Applied Mathematics
Fellow Members of the IEEE
Fellows of the International Federation of Automatic Control
Washington University in St. Louis mathematicians
National Research Council (Italy) people